El asesino se embarca (English: "The Assassin Goes on Board") is a 1967 Mexican action thriller film directed by Miguel M. Delgado and starring Enrique Lizalde, Regina Torné, Armando Silvestre, Tito Junco and Jorge Russek.

The film's sets were designed by art director Manuel Fontanals.

Plot
A police officer unlucky with women is on a ferry from La Paz to Mazatlán where a criminal wants to take possession of some plates to forge dollars.

Cast
Enrique Lizalde as Víctor Medina
Regina Torné as Paula
Armando Silvestre as Tony
Tito Junco as Iván
Jorge Russek as Villagrán
Barbara Angely as Lidia
Jessica Munguía as Vicky
Eduardo Noriega as Captain Valdés
Julián de Meriche as The cripple
Joaquín Martínez as Pedro
Eduardo MacGregor as Fake Husband (as Eduardo Mac Gregor)
Elizabeth San Román as Child's Mom
Federico Falcón as Saldívar (as Federico del Castillo)
John Kelly as Gringo
Victor Eberg as Ivan's Bodyguard (as Victor Eckberg)
Fernando Yapur as Ivan's Bodyguard
Pepito Velázquez as Child (as niño José Velázquez)
Martha Navarro as Rosita
Horacio Salinas as Serafín

Release
The film was released on 31 August 1967 in the Variedades cinema, for two weeks.

Reception
In Breve historia del cine mexicano: primer siglo, 1897–1997, Emilio García Riera cited the film as an example, alongside S.O.S. Conspiración Bikini (1967) and Cuatro contra el crimen (1968), of Mexican films made in the 1960s to cash in on the success of the James Bond films, referring to them as examples of "underdeveloped James Bond-ism."

References

External links

1967 films
1960s Spanish-language films
1960s action thriller films
Mexican action thriller films
Films directed by Miguel M. Delgado
Films set on ships
Counterfeit money in film
1960s Mexican films